Pradeep Shantaram Patwardhan (8 February 1958 – 9 August 2022) was an Indian actor and comedian who predominantly worked in the Marathi theatre. His role in Marathi play Moruchi Mavshi led him to stardom. His well-known movies include Ek Full Chaar Half (1991), Jaml Ho Jaml (1995), Me Shivajiraje Bhosale Boltoy (2009), and Gola Berij (2012).

Death 
Patwardhan died on 9 August 2022 at the age of 64 at his residence in Zaobawadi Thakurdwar area of Girgaon, Mumbai. His last rites were carried out in Chandanwadi crematorium.

Filmography

Marathi play
 Moruchi Mavshi (1985 onwards)

Film

Television series
 Shwetambara (1983)
 Nasti Aafat (1989)
 Sukhachya Sarini He Man Baware
 Maharashtrachi Hasyajatra
 Gharakul

References

1958 births
2022 deaths
Male actors in Marathi cinema
Male actors in Hindi cinema
Indian male television actors
Indian male comedians
Male actors in Marathi theatre
Marathi actors
Male actors from Mumbai
Indian male stage actors